Toshimasa Furukawa (born 11 May 1947) is a Japanese alpine skier. He competed in the men's slalom at the 1972 Winter Olympics.

References

1947 births
Living people
Japanese male alpine skiers
Olympic alpine skiers of Japan
Alpine skiers at the 1972 Winter Olympics
Sportspeople from Hokkaido
20th-century Japanese people